Beaulard is a railway station in Beaulard, Piedmont, Italy. The station is located on the Turin-Modane railway and the train services are operated by Trenitalia.

Train services
The station is served by the following services:

Turin Metropolitan services (SFM3) Bardonecchia - Bussoleno - Turin

References

Railway stations in the Metropolitan City of Turin